The men's 4 × 200 m freestyle relay event for the 1976 Summer Olympics was held in Montreal. The event took place on Wednesday, 21 July.

Final

Heats

Heat 1

Heat 2

Heat 3

References

External links
Official Olympic Report

Swimming at the 1976 Summer Olympics
Men's events at the 1976 Summer Olympics